Kemal Karahodžić (born July 26, 1989) is a Hungarian professional basketball player for Kecskemét of the Nemzeti Bajnokság I/A. He also represents the Hungarian national team internationally.

International career
Karahodžić was a member of the Hungarian national team that participated at the EuroBasket 2017. Over six tournament games, he averaged 2.2 points, 2.7 rebounds and 0.6 assists per game.

Personal life
He was born in Bačka Topola, SAP Vojvodina, SFR Yugoslavia to a Bosniak family. His younger brother, Kenan, is also a professional basketball player and represents the Bosnia and Herzegovina national team internationally.

References

External links
Profile at eurobasket.com

1989 births
Living people
Basketball League of Serbia players
Bosniaks of Serbia
Hungarian men's basketball players
Hungarian expatriate basketball people in Serbia
Hungarian people of Bosnia and Herzegovina descent
Kecskeméti TE (basketball) players
KK Spartak Subotica players
People from Bačka Topola
Serbian expatriate basketball people in Hungary
Serbian men's basketball players
Centers (basketball)